Yisrael Campbell (born Christopher Campbell) is a Philadelphia-born Israeli comedian.

Campbell, who is of Irish and Italian descent, grew up Catholic in a Philadelphia suburb. One of his aunts is a Catholic nun. A typical Campbell joke is that his aunt is a nun, "which of course makes Jesus my uncle, allowing for easier parking in Jerusalem." Campbell converted to Judaism with a Reform rabbi, and says that a "spiritual hunger" led him to have a second conversion with a Conservative rabbi. On a four-month visit to Israel in 2000 he decided to have a third conversion and live as an Orthodox Jew.

Campbell and his wife Avital, an Orthodox rabbi, have four children, including twins, and live in Jerusalem.

Campbell and his wife both went to the school, The Pardes Institute of Jewish Studies.

The Guardian wrote that "As far as we know, Lenny Bruce never had sex with an Orthodox Jew, but if he had – he would have produced Yisrael Campbell."

In 2006 Campbell appeared with the Israeli-Palestinian Comedy Tour.

Campbell is the subject of a 2008 documentary film, Circumcise Me.

References

External links 
 yisraelcampbell.com
https://www.pardes.org.il/

Living people
American emigrants to Israel
American former Christians
American Orthodox Jews
American people of Irish descent
American people of Italian descent
American stand-up comedians
Converts to Judaism from Roman Catholicism
Converts to Reform Judaism
Converts to Conservative Judaism
Converts to Orthodox Judaism
Israeli male comedians
Israeli Orthodox Jews
Israeli people of Irish descent
Israeli people of Italian descent
Israeli stand-up comedians
Jewish Israeli comedians
People from Philadelphia
Year of birth missing (living people)
Orthodox and Hasidic Jewish comedians
Jewish American comedians
21st-century Israeli comedians
21st-century American Jews